Bruce Frederick Von Hoff  (November 17, 1943 – September 11, 2012) was a Major League Baseball pitcher. He was born in Oakland, California.

Von Hoff pitched in a total of thirteen games for the Houston Astros in the 1965 and 1967 seasons.

He died at his home in Gulfport, Florida.

References

External links 

Venezuelan Professional Baseball League

1943 births
2012 deaths
Amarillo Sonics players
Arkansas Travelers players
Asheville Tourists players
Baseball players from Oakland, California
Cocoa Astros players
Dallas–Fort Worth Spurs players
Decatur Commodores players
Durham Bulls players
El Paso Sun Kings players
Florida Instructional League Reds players
Houston Astros players
Industriales de Valencia players
Major League Baseball pitchers
Northern Illinois Huskies baseball players
Oklahoma City 89ers players
People from Gulfport, Florida
St. Petersburg Cardinals players